Henry Khaaba Olonga (born 3 July 1976) is a Zimbabwean former cricketer, who played Test and One Day International (ODI) cricket for Zimbabwe. In domestic first-class cricket in Zimbabwe, Olonga played for Matabeleland, Mashonaland and Manicaland. When he made his Test debut in January 1995, he was the first black cricketer and the youngest person to play for Zimbabwe. He was a regular member of the Zimbabwe team from 1998 to 2003. He featured in three World Cup tournaments in 1996, 1999 and 2003. During his playing days, he formed a rivalry against former Indian veteran batsman Sachin Tendulkar whenever Zimbabwe and India played against each other in international cricket. He was also regarded as Zimbabwe cricket's poster boy.

He was considered one of the fastest bowlers in international cricket, but also one of the more inaccurate, bowling many wides and no-balls. His international career came to an end in 2003 after Olonga and teammate Andy Flower wore black armbands during an international cricket match in the 2003 Cricket World Cup to "mourn the death of democracy" in Zimbabwe. Death threats forced him to live in exile in England. Olonga announced his retirement from international cricket after Zimbabwe's final game in the 2003 World Cup at the age of 26 when he was in the prime years of his career. Olonga and Flower were given honorary life membership of the Marylebone Cricket Club (MCC) later in 2003. He and Flower were also honoured by the Cricket Writer's Club during the annual dinner where they were conferred with the Peter Smith Memorial Award, an award which is given as an annual acknowledgement of outstanding contributions to the game of cricket.

In 2014, he inaugurated training net facilities at the Keswick Cricket Club in Lake District worth 17, 000.

Early life
Olonga was born in Lusaka, Zambia. His father John Olonga was a  Kenyan surgeon and his mother was Zimbabwean. He has two sisters and two brothers as well as ten half-brothers and sisters from his father's first marriage. Olonga, in his autobiography once made a shocking revelation that his parents had to be separated temporarily when he was just four years old after his mother getting to know that her husband had deliberately hidden his first marriage from her. One of his brothers, Victor Olonga, played professional rugby and became captain of the Zimbabwe national team. His uncle is the former Kenyan minister Francis Masakhalia. 

Soon after his birth, his family had returned to Kenya. After returning to Kenya, the family then moved to Bulawayo in Zimbabwe as his father intended to provide and ensure access to higher quality education for his children. Olonga was educated at Rhodes Estate Preparatory School (REPS) and began playing cricket at the age of eight and also played cricket for the Partridges, the Zimbabwe national primary schools cricket team. He then attended Plumtree School, where he became head boy. He was involved in acting, athletics and rugby in addition to cricket. He was nominated as one of the finalists in the search hunt for Zimbabwe's best high school actor for his performance as Charlie Davenport (a character which featured in the film 1950 film Annie Get Your Gun) while he was still the head boy.

In a school cricket match against Brighton College, he scored 103 runs and took 8 wickets for 15 runs. He found a firm Christian faith in 1992 at a youth camp in Marondera. He was also selected to play for Matabeleland in national primary schools cricket week.

Domestic career
Olonga made his debut in first-class cricket in March 1994, aged 17, playing for Matabeleland against Mashonaland in the Logan Cup at Harare Sports Club. He took five wickets in the match, but had varied performances over the next couple of years. He continued to play domestic first-class cricket for Matabeleland until 1998–99 and then for Mashonaland A in 2001–02. Olonga later played for Manicaland in 2002–03.

International career
He was not an obvious or automatic choice when he was selected to make his international debut for Zimbabwe in the Test against Pakistan in Harare in January 1995 (although Olonga could have been selected to play for Zimbabwe against Sri Lanka earlier in 1995, when David Brain and Eddo Brandes were absent due to injury, but he was found to be ineligible as he still held Kenyan nationality). It was revealed that his father was against Olonga's decision to pursue his career in cricket and wanted him to compete at the Olympics representing Kenya. However, Olonga refused his father's interest and did not give up his cricket ambitions. Having given up his Kenyan citizenship, Olonga became the youngest player to represent Zimbabwe in international cricket, aged 18 years and 212 days. He grew up watching the likes of Malcolm Marshall and Allan Donald and consider them as his childhood idols.

A right arm fast bowler, Olonga was also the first black cricketer to play for Zimbabwe and the third Zambian-born Test cricketer after Phil Edmonds and Neal Radford of England. Zimbabwe beat Pakistan by an innings and 64 runs, the team's first ever Test victory, mainly due to a double century from Grant Flower, as well as centuries from Andy Flower and Guy Whittall. Olonga took the wicket of Saeed Anwar in his first over, but he was no-balled once for throwing. With help from Dennis Lillee, he rebuilt his action at the MRF Pace Foundation before returning to international cricket. He was overlooked from Zimbabwe squad for the 1998 Commonwealth Games in September 1998. Thereafter, he began training harder with fellow seamer Heath Streak and got into the national team after remodelling his bowling action. 

He made his debut in ODIs playing against South Africa in October 1995. He was man of the match when he took his first 5-wicket haul (5–70) in Tests, playing against India in October 1998, Zimbabwe's second Test victory. He was also the spearhead of the team that won Zimbabwe's first overseas Test, beating Pakistan in Peshawar in November 1998. Olonga took a second and final Test 5-wicket haul (5–93) in a losing cause against Pakistan in November 2002.

He played 30 Test matches for Zimbabwe, taking 68 wickets with a bowling average of 38.52. Olonga also played 50 One Day Internationals as well, taking 58 wickets at an average of 34.08. He holds the record for the best bowling in an ODI by a Zimbabwean, with figures of 6–19 against England in Cape Town in 2000.

Cricket World Cups
Olonga joined the Zimbabwe team at the 1996 Cricket World Cup in India, Pakistan and Sri Lanka. He was selected to play in Zimbabwe's final game of the competition, against India, but asked to be omitted as he was out of practice. He played in 7 matches in the 1999 Cricket World Cup in England. He was best known for his bowling spell against India at the 1999 Cricket World Cup where he took three wickets in the final over of the group stage match and eventually Zimbabwe created a massive upset by defeating India by a close margin of three runs. It was also Zimbabwe's first ever win against India in a World Cup match.

He was selected for the Zimbabwe team at the 2003 Cricket World Cup, held in South Africa, Zimbabwe and Kenya. Some of the countries playing in the tournament were concerned about security: New Zealand had refused to play in Nairobi and England refused to play in Harare.

Controversy
Olonga and his teammate Andy Flower achieved international recognition by wearing a black armband in the match against Namibia at Harare Sports Club, to "mourn the death of democracy" in Zimbabwe under the government led by Robert Mugabe. Olonga and Flower released a statement on 10 February 2003, the second day of the tournament, stating in part:

Flower scored 39 runs, Olonga conceded 8 runs from 3 overs but took no wickets as Zimbabwe won the match. Their protest was supported in the world press and more widely internationally, but caused a political storm in Zimbabwe. The minister of information Jonathan Moyo labelled Olonga an "Uncle Tom" with "a black skin and a white mask".

Despite the protest, Flower continued to play for Zimbabwe in the tournament, but Olonga was omitted from the team for six matches, ostensibly on grounds of his poor form (including a walkover against England who refused to travel to Harare). Olonga was selected to play in one more World Cup match, against Kenya in Bloemfontein in the Super Sixes stage of the tournament on 12 March. He was also expelled by the Takashinga Cricket Club branding him as "traitor" and it was revealed that his girlfriend also eventually broke up with him in a mail.

A warrant was issued in Zimbabwe for Olonga's arrest on charges of treason. Death threats made him go temporarily into hiding and then into exile in England after Zimbabwe's last match of the tournament, against Sri Lanka in East London. A knee injury forced his retirement from first-class cricket later in 2003, but he has played occasional matches since 2005 for the Lashings World XI. By 2010, he was calling for the restoration of international cricket between Zimbabwe and other countries.

Beyond cricket 
Olonga met physical education teacher Tara Read while both were attending the Australian Institute of Sport's cricket program in Adelaide. The couple married in 2004. Olonga had lived in exile in Britain for 12 years from 2003 to 2015 and then moved to Australia in 2015 along with his wife and his two children. His Zimbabwean passport was expired in 2006 when he was living in exile in England and he could not leave England for another nine years. In 2001, he composed the lyrics for the song Our Zimbabwe. He was also nicknamed as "Singing Seamer" by the English press following the release of Our Zimbabwe song.

On Friday 13 October 2006, Olonga won Five's The All Star Talent Show with 50% of the overall votes.

He is now pursuing a career as a cricket commentator and singer and released an album Aurelia in 2006. His autobiography, Blood, Sweat and Treason, was released in July 2010 by Vision Sports Publishing and was longlisted for the William Hill Sports Book of the Year 2010. In addition, he also served as a public speaker, photographer, art worker and author. After composing music, he made his singing debut in 2016 in a charity event performing Nessun dorma at the Sydney Cricket Ground.

In 2019, he entered as a contestant on the eight season of The Voice Australia and performed Anthony Warlow's album This Is the Moment! in the audition. He got three chair turn from Delta Goodrem, Boy George and Kelly Rowland. He chose Kelly Rowland as his coach and was eliminated in the Battle rounds. He was eliminated from the Voice Australia show after forgetting the lyrics of Elton John's Can You Feel the Love. In an interview with Sportstar, he revealed that his singing career is his second innings of his life.

In August 2019, he joined the fundraiser of the African AIDS Foundation to raise funds for the organisation. He was appointed as global ambassador for Anglican Aid.

Discography

Albums

See also
 Zimbabwean cricket crisis
 List of Test cricketers born in non-Test playing nations

References

External links 
 
 Full text of Olonga and Flower's World Cup protest statement
 
 Henry's autobiography, Blood, Sweat and Treason
 Henry Olonga tells Nigel Bovey of The War Cry that it was his Christian faith that inspired him to make World Cup protest
 Henry Olonga talks cricket, music and Christianity with Nigel Bovey of the Salvation Army newspaper The War Cry
 Andy Flower & Henry Olonga: the 'death of democracy' remembered, BBC Sport, 7 February 2013

1976 births
Living people
Sportspeople from Lusaka
Alumni of Plumtree School
Manicaland cricketers
Matabeleland cricketers
Zimbabwe One Day International cricketers
Zimbabwe Test cricketers
Zimbabwean cricketers
Cricketers at the 1996 Cricket World Cup
Cricketers at the 1999 Cricket World Cup
Cricketers at the 2003 Cricket World Cup
Zambian cricketers
Zimbabwean Christians
Zimbabwean exiles
Zimbabwean cricket commentators
Zimbabwean emigrants to the United Kingdom